GSH may refer to:

 Glutathione, an important antioxidant
 George S. Halas, owner and coach of the Chicago Bears
 Goshen Municipal Airport (IATA code), Indiana, USA
 Global Scholars Hall, a building on the University of Oregon campus, Eugene, Oregon, USA
 Ghost Squad Hackers, hacktivist group
 Good Shepherd Homes, a British charity
 Gryazev-Shipunov (GSh), a weapons marque

See also

 GSHS (disambiguation)
 ГШ (disambiguation)
 
 
 
 
 
 GS (disambiguation)